Durupınar is the name of several places in Turkey:

Durupınar site, in the Tendürek mountains, Ağrı Province, named for Turkish Army Captain İlhan Durupınar, the site is notable for its role in Searches for Noah's Ark
Durupınar, Haymana, Haymana, Ankara
Durupınar, İnebolu, Kastamonu Province
Durupınar, Devrek, Devrek 
Durupınar, Elazığ, Elazığ Province